Halabja Stadium (Kurdish: یاریگای ھەڵەبجە, Arabic: ملعب حلبجة) is a multi-purpose stadium in Halabja, Northern Iraq. It is currently used mostly for football matches and serves as the home stadium of Halabja SC. The stadium holds 9,000 people.

See also 
List of football stadiums in Iraq

References

Football venues in Iraq
Athletics (track and field) venues in Iraq
Multi-purpose stadiums in Iraq
2009 establishments in Iraq
Sports venues completed in 2009